Geeks Without Borders is a non-governmental organization which donates computers and related technology to areas in need around the world.

History 

Geeks Without Borders is based in Eugene, Oregon, in the United States. 
The organization was founded in October 2002, and granted IRS 501(c)3 non-profit status by the IRS in April 2003. Geeks Without Borders is incorporated in Oregon as a public-benefit corporation and is an all-volunteer organization, with no paid staff.

Types of Donations 

Donations typically consist of several computers which are configured and networked together before deployment to the field. 

Some donated equipment is delivered directly to the field by Geeks Without Borders volunteers. Geeks Without Borders also delivers donations to partner organizations for field deployment. 

Geeks Without Borders also supports and maintains all computer systems that they deliver.

Areas of Assistance 

Since 2003 the group has focused on Mexico and Central America, with a secondary focus on donations to Africa. In recent years, they have also donated to several organizations within the United States.

See also
Computer technology for developing areas

External links 
 Geeks Without Borders Web site

References 

Organizations based in Eugene, Oregon
Organizations established in 2002
Information technology charities
2002 establishments in Oregon